The Cadet Field House is an indoor sports complex in the western United States, located  at the U.S. Air Force Academy in Colorado, near Colorado Springs.

Facilities
The Cadet Field House has several different facilities.

 Clune Arena, a 6,002-seat basketball arena
 Cadet Ice Arena, a 2,502-seat ice hockey rink
 A  six-lane indoor track with seating for 925 spectators
 An AstroTurf playing field,  in length
 A  training room

Clune Arena
The Clune Arena is the basketball arena in the complex, named after Colonel John J. Clune, long-time USAFA Director of Athletics, and seats 5,858 people.

Cadet Ice Arena
The Cadet Ice Arena is a 2,502-seat hockey rink is home to the Academy's Falcon ice hockey team. It was built in 1968, and is part of the Cadet Field House. The team now competes in Atlantic Hockey along with Army and others in the conference.

Location
The Cadet Field House is located across the street from the Cadet Gymnasium. The two buildings are connected by an underground tunnel.

Trophies
The Cadet Field House houses the Commander-in-Chief's Trophy in those years when Air Force is in possession of it.

See also
 List of NCAA Division I basketball arenas

References

External links
 Athletic facilities of the Academy (archive)
Cadet Ice Arena info sheet
Clune Arena home page

Air Force Falcons sports venues
College wrestling venues in the United States
Indoor track and field venues in the United States
1968 establishments in Colorado
Sports venues completed in 1968